Anne Statt (married Anne Skovgaard) is a retired female badminton player from England, who later started for Denmark.

Career
Statt won the gold medal at the 1978 European Badminton Championships in women's doubles with Nora Perry.

She represented England and won double gold in the team event and women's doubles, at the 1978 Commonwealth Games in Edmonton, Alberta, Canada.

References

European results
Statistics at badmintonengland.co.uk
Statistics at badminton.dk

Living people
Year of birth missing (living people)
English female badminton players
Danish female badminton players
Commonwealth Games medallists in badminton
Commonwealth Games gold medallists for England
Badminton players at the 1978 Commonwealth Games
Medallists at the 1978 Commonwealth Games